Jean-Pierre Leleux (born 8 May 1947) is a French politician and a member of the Senate of France. He represents the Alpes-Maritimes department and is a member of the Union for a Popular Movement Party.

References
Page on the Senate website

1947 births
Living people
French Senators of the Fifth Republic
Union for a Popular Movement politicians
Senators of Alpes-Maritimes